Sikivu Hutchinson is an American author, playwright and director. Her multi-genre work explores feminism, gender justice, racial justice, LGBTQIA+ rights, humanism and atheism. She is the author of Humanists in the Hood: Unapologetically Black, Feminist, and Heretical (2020), White Nights, Black Paradise (2015), Godless Americana: Race and Religious Rebels (2013), Moral Combat: Black Atheists, Gender Politics, and the Values Wars (2011), and Imagining Transit: Race, Gender, and Transportation Politics in Los Angeles (Travel Writing Across the Disciplines) (2003). Her plays include "White Nights, Black Paradise", "Rock 'n' Roll Heretic" and "Narcolepsy, Inc.". Moral Combat is the first book on atheism to be published by an African-American woman. In 2013 she was named Secular Woman of the year and was awarded Foundation Beyond Belief's 2015 Humanist Innovator award. She was also a recipient of Harvard's 2020 Humanist of the Year award.

Early life and education
Her grandfather Earl Hutchinson Sr. and father Earl Ofari Hutchinson are both authors. Hutchinson graduated from New York University with a Ph.D. in Performance Studies in 1999.

Early career 
Hutchinson has written articles for The Huffington Post, The Feminist Wire, thehumanist.com, the LA Progressive, and The L.A. Times and the Washington Post. She is a Senior Fellow with the Institute of Humanist Studies and founder of the Women's Leadership Project program for girls of color in South L.A.

She has taught women's studies, urban studies, cultural studies, African American Humanism and education at the California Institute of the Arts, UCLA, Pitzer College, and Western Washington University.

Moral Combat
In her book, Moral Combat, she examines what she views as the hijacking of civil rights by the Christian Right; the connections between humanism, feminism and social justice; the importance of humanism for pre-college education; the backlash of religious fundamentalism, in the vein of the Tea Party, against progressive public policy; and the efforts of atheists of color to challenge the "New Atheist" movement, which values a narrow conception of science and disregards both social and also economic justice.  Hutchinson frames her critique in the contemporary realities of working- and middle-class African-American communities which are just as steeped in the tradition of religiosity-due to capitalism and de facto segregation—as they are in the cultural trappings of the Black Church.  Hutchinson highlights Nella Larsen's work as a  touchstone for black feminist humanist thought.  Hutchinson also explores the emergence of black atheist and freethought activism and spotlights the voices of African American non-believers from around the country.

Black Skeptics group 
Formed by Hutchinson in March 2010 she explained to KTYM radio the reason she formed the group was a "response to the emergent need amongst African-American non-believers to have some kind of community and interpersonal connection to each other, in real time".  She believes that there is a large community of black non-believers on social media sites, but it is important for these people to find a "sanctuary from the hyper-religiosity that African-Americans are seeped in". The group was featured in a May 2012 article that chronicled how greater numbers of African Americans were leaving religious faith and adopting atheism and freethought.

Political views

Diversity in religious skepticism 

Hutchinson has stated that "While black male non-believers are given more leeway to be heretics or just MIA from church, black women who openly profess non-theist views are deemed especially traitorous, having 'abandoned' their primary role as purveyors of cultural and religious tradition." Much of Hutchinson's work focuses on the cultural and social history of African-American secular humanist thought and its role in black liberation struggle. Hutchinson's work also challenges the social conservatism of the Black Church with respect to abortion, gay rights and women's rights.

Hutchinson has challenged the lack of racial diversity and attention to institutional racism in the secular and New Atheist movements.  She has championed the inclusion of anti-racism, anti-sexism, and anti-heterosexism in mainstream secular humanist and New Atheist discourse.  She has also written extensively on the role of freethought and secular humanism in black women's liberation and gender justice.

In 2016, Hutchinson criticized the merger of the secular organizations Center for Inquiry and the Richard Dawkins Foundation for Reason and Science which gave Richard Dawkins a seat on the board of directors of the Center for Inquiry. Her criticism was that both organizations had an all-white board of directors.

Humanism 

Hutchinson subscribes to a radical humanist vision that eschews religious and social hierarchies of race, gender, sexuality, class, and ability status because they undermine the universal human rights and self-determination of oppressed peoples.  For communities of color, radical Humanism reinforces the cultural legitimacy, visibility, and validity of non-believers of color within the context of a white supremacist, heterosexist, patriarchal, economically disenfranchising ideological regime that equates morality with Abrahamic religious paradigms and beliefs. Radical humanism rejects the notion that there is only one way to be black or Latino, and that women and the LGBT community are marginal and morally aberrant.

Hutchinson has argued for the articulation of a culturally relevant humanism based on secular social, racial, and gender justice that eschews notions of colorblindness and post-racialism, focusing instead on the lived experiences, cultural knowledge, social histories and social capital of diverse communities She has argued that the racist and white supremacist objectification of women of color as hyper-sexual "Jezebels" has made African American and Latina women especially vulnerable to paradigms of femininity that emphasize self-sacrifice and obeisance to conservative Christian mores.  Hutchinson has written that the heterosexist ideal of the "sacrificial good woman" of faith straitjackets women of color and effectively contributes to high rates of intimate partner violence, sexual assault and HIV/STI contraction in communities of color because masculinity and femininity are viewed as oppositional to each other. Hutchinson considers her activism in the humanist sphere to be inextricably bound to the other identities.

Billboard campaign 
In 2012 Hutchinson was featured in a national billboard campaign of prominent black non-believers launched by African Americans for Humanism.  She was paired with author Zora Neale Hurston, a folklorist of African-American culture who wrote of being a skeptic in her essay "Religion."

Books

References

External links 
"Sikivu Hutchinson" at HuffPost
Women's Leadership Project
Black Skeptics Blog
Blackfemlens Blog
LA Progressive

African-American atheists
African-American feminists
American feminist writers
American atheism activists
Atheist feminists
Tisch School of the Arts alumni
University of California, Los Angeles faculty
Western Washington University faculty
California Institute of the Arts faculty
African-American women writers
American women writers
American skeptics
Living people
Year of birth missing (living people)
African-American writers
Writers about religion and science